CHLR-FM is a First Nations community radio station that operates at 89.9 FM in Rigolet, Newfoundland and Labrador, Canada.

The station was licensed in 1986.

CHLR was a former callsign of an unrelated radio station in Moncton, New Brunswick from 1981 to 1985.

References

External links
 

Hlr